The singles discography of American country artist, George Jones, contains 182 singles. Of the total, 136 were released with Jones as the solo artist. In addition, 31 were issued with Jones being part of a collaboration (not counting his duets with Tammy Wynette). Thirdly, eight singles were issued with Jones being part of a featured act. Fourthly, seven released were promotional singles. Additionally, 14 songs that are not released as singles are included that made any major chart. Finally, 21 music videos which were first issued as singles are also listed. Jones had his first chart success in 1955 with several top ten Billboard Hot Country Songs singles: "Why Baby Why", "What Am I Worth" and "You Gotta Be My Baby". After several more top ten releases, "White Lightning" became his first to top the Billboard country chart. Along with "Who Shot Sam", both singles were also his first to make the Hot 100 charts.

During the sixties decade, Jones's success on the country charts continued. He reached the top of the Billboard country songs list twice in the early decade with "She Thinks I Still Care" and "Tender Years". He later topped the charts in 1967 with "Walk Through This World with Me". Among his highest-charting top ten singles that decade were "The Window Up Above" (1960), "Aching, Breaking Heart" (1962), "A Girl I Used to Know"  (1962), "You Comb Her Hair" (1963), "The Race Is On" (1964), "As Long as I Live" (1968) and "I'll Share My World with You" (1969). Jones also collaborated with Margie Singleton, Melba Montgomery and Gene Pitney respectively during the decade. Among his collaborative releases with the artists were "Waltz of the Angels" (1962), "We Must Have Been Out of Our Minds" (1963) and "Things Have Gone to Pieces" (1965).

Jones had more commercial success during the seventies. He reached the number one spot on both the Billboard and RPM country charts with "The Grand Tour" (1974) and "The Door" (1974). Most of his singles reached the top ten during the first half of the decade: "A Good Year for the Roses" (1970), "Right Won't Touch a Hand" (1971), "Loving You Could Never Be Better" (1972) and "A Picture of Me (Without You)" (1973). As the seventies progressed, his singles reached the top ten and top 20 with less frequency. In 1980, Jones returned to the number one spot with "He Stopped Loving Her Today". It was followed in the eighties by the chart-topping singles "Still Doin' Time" (1981) and "I Always Get Lucky with You" (1983). Thirteen additional singles reached the top ten during the eighties. Among his most successful were "I'm Not Ready Yet" (1980), "Shine On (Shine All Your Sweet Love on Me)" (1982), "She's My Rock" (1984), "Who's Gonna Fill Their Shoes" and "I'm a One-Woman Man" (1988).

Jones's singles continued to make charting positions into the nineties. The songs "You Couldn't Get the Picture" (1991), "I Don't Need Your Rockin' Chair" (1992), "High-Tech Redneck" (1993) and "Choices" (1999) reached the top 40 of the Billboard country list. In the 2000s, a duet with Garth Brooks reached the top 25 of the country chart. During the nineties, Jones was featured on several singles by other artists. Both "A Few Ole Country Boys" (a duet with Randy Travis) and "You Don't Seem to Miss Me" (a duet with Patty Loveless) made the top 20 of the Billboard country chart.

As a solo artist

1950s

1960s

1970s

1980s

1990s

2000s

As a collaborative artist

As a featured artist

Promotional singles

Other charted songs

Music videos

See also
George Jones albums discography

Notes

References

External links
 George Jones releases at Discogs
 George Jones discography at AllMusic

Country music discographies
 
Discographies of American artists